A list of Turkish films that will be first released in 2017.

List of films

See also
2017 in Turkey

References

External links
 

Film
2017
Lists of 2017 films by country or language